Clare Wilson ( – 9 October 1917) was an English professional footballer who played as an inside left.

Career
Wilson spent his early career with Wallsend Park Villa and Gateshead Town. He signed for Bradford City from Gateshead in March 1907. He made 2 league appearances for the club, before joining Glossop in December 1908. He later played for Oldham Athletic and Gateshead.

Death
Wilson joined the Durham Light Infantry in December 1915 and then transferred to the Manchester Regiment's 22nd Battalion. He was killed in action in 1917 on the Western Front.

Sources

References

Date of birth missing
1886 births
1917 deaths
People from the Borough of Harrogate
English footballers
Bradford City A.F.C. players
Glossop North End A.F.C. players
Oldham Athletic A.F.C. players
English Football League players
Association football inside forwards
British military personnel killed in World War I
Manchester Regiment soldiers
Durham Light Infantry soldiers
British Army personnel of World War I
Military personnel from Yorkshire